Gay Days is a 2009 Israeli documentary film about the emergence of an LGBT community in Israel, starring major activists in Israel's cultural life and LGBT community: Gal Uchovsky, Eytan Fox, Ellyot, Amalia Ziv, Amit Kama and others and some rare archival footage from pride events, feature films and student films.

Background
In 1985, there were three openly gay persons in Israel. By 1998, there were 3,000. In a short period of time Israel went through a change. Director Yair Qedar documented this revolution in the newspaper, The Pink Times (הזמן הוורוד). The film uses archival materials, personal stories and Qedar's personal diary.

Screenings and reception
The film premiered in June 2009 in the Tel Aviv International LGBT Film Festival, 2009. The film also showed in the Panorama at the 60th Berlin International Film Festival and the London Lesbian and Gay Film Festival 2010. and it is shown all over the world since in universities, film festivals and cinematic events.

The television premiere was on the Israeli documentary channel yes Docu, during July 2009, and was shown in Keshet, the commercial TV.

See also

 LGBT rights in Israel
 Homosexuality and Judaism

References

External links
 
 Gay Days at the Athens International Lesbian & Gay Film Festival
 Gay Days  at the Torino GLBT Film Festival

2009 films
2000s Hebrew-language films
2009 documentary films
Israeli documentary films
Israeli LGBT-related films
Documentary films about LGBT topics
2009 LGBT-related films